Harry Ernest Rauch (November 9, 1925 – June 18, 1979) was an American mathematician, who worked on complex analysis and differential geometry. He was born in Trenton, New Jersey, and died in White Plains, New York.

Rauch earned his PhD in 1948 from Princeton University under Salomon Bochner with thesis Generalizations of Some Classic Theorems to the Case of Functions of Several Variables. From 1949 to 1951 he was a visiting member of the Institute for Advanced Study. He was in the 1960s a professor at Yeshiva University and from the mid-1970s a professor at the City University of New York. His research was on differential geometry (especially geodesics on n-dimensional manifolds), Riemann surfaces, and theta functions.

In the early 1950s Rauch made fundamental progress on the quarter-pinched sphere conjecture in differential geometry. In the case of positive sectional curvature and simply connected differential manifolds, Rauch proved that, under the condition that the sectional curvature K does not deviate too much from K = 1, the manifold must be homeomorphic to the sphere (i.e. the case where there is constant sectional curvature K = 1). Rauch's result created a new paradigm in differential geometry, that of a "pinching theorem;" in Rauch's case, the assumption was that the curvature
was pinched between 0.76 and 1. This was later relaxed to pinching between 0.55 and 1 by  Wilhelm Klingenberg, and finally replaced with the sharp result of pinching between 0.25 and 1
by Marcel Berger and Klingenberg in the early 1960s. This optimal result is known as the sphere theorem for Riemannian manifolds.

The Rauch comparison theorem is also named after Harry Rauch.  He proved it in 1951.

Publications

Articles 
 
 
 
 
 with Hershel M. Farkas: 
 
 with H. M. Farkas: 
 with H. M. Farkas: 
 with Isaac Chavel:

Books 
 with Hershel M. Farkas: Theta functions with applications to Riemann Surfaces, Williams and Wilkins, Baltimore 1974
 with Aaron Lebowitz: Elliptic functions, theta functions and Riemann Surfaces, Williams and Wilkins, 1973
 with Matthew Graber, William Zlot: Elementary Geometry, Krieger 1973, 2nd edn. 1979
 Geodesics and Curvature in Differential Geometry in the Large, Yeshiva University 1959

Sources 
 Hershel M. Farkas, Isaac Chavel (eds.): Differential geometry and complex analysis: a volume dedicated to the memory of Harry Ernest Rauch, Springer, 1985

References

External links 
 

1925 births
1979 deaths
20th-century American mathematicians
Differential geometers
People from Trenton, New Jersey
Princeton University alumni
Yeshiva University faculty
City University of New York faculty
20th-century American Jews